Robert "Shea" Taylor is a songwriter, producer, multi-instrumentalist based in New York City. He established an early successful songwriting partnership with Def Jam's R&B singer-songwriter phenom Ne-Yo, and has also worked with Rihanna, Beyoncé, Ariana Grande, Janet Jackson, Chris Brown, and Wyclef Jean.

Taylor has songwriting credits on seven tracks off Beyonce's fourth studio album, 4 (2011). The album was a commercial success; earning a platinum certification in the US, and debuting atop the US Billboard 200 chart, with first-week sales of over 300,000. "Love on Top" topped the US Hot R&B/Hip-Hop Songs chart and Adult R&B Airplay chart in March 2012. "Run the World (Girls)" also reached number one on the US Hot Dance Club Songs  and is certified Gold in the US and New Zealand, as well as Platinum in Australia and Canada. "Best Thing I Never Had" climbed to the top of Nielsen's Urban airplay chart in September and peaked at number four on the Hot R&B/Hip-Hop Songs chart.

Taylor co-wrote the lead single "Thinkin Bout You" and "Pilot Jones" on Frank Ocean's debut studio album Channel Orange (2012). The album debuted atop on the US Billboard R&B/Hip-Hop Albums chart  and number two on the UK R&B Albums chart. It also debuted at number two on the Billboard 200.

Shea is published by Downtown Music Publishing.

Production and writing credits
All credits are sourced from Allmusic and Discogs.

References

American multi-instrumentalists
African-American songwriters
African-American record producers
Record producers from New York (state)
Musicians from New York City
Songwriters from New York (state)
Living people
Year of birth missing (living people)
21st-century African-American people